From the Inside is the third studio album by the American country rock band Poco. The band was reportedly unhappy with it following its release. This album was the first to include new member Paul Cotton as lead guitarist, who replaced Jim Messina.  Messina would go on to form his partnership with Kenny Loggins.

Reception

In his Allmusic review, music critic Bruce Eder called the album "Poco's most unusual record... featuring the group generating a leaner, more stripped-down, somewhat bluesier sound. The harmonies are less radiant and the guitars more subdued, and the spirits also a little more low-key than usual. But the sound they get is still appealing, the singing more reflective."

Track listing
"Hoe Down" (Richie Furay, Rusty Young) – 2:04
"Bad Weather" (Paul Cotton) – 5:02
"What Am I Gonna Do" (Furay) – 3:46
"You Are the One" (Furay) – 3:48
"Railroad Days" (Cotton) – 3:35
"From the Inside" (Timothy B. Schmit) – 3:10
"Do You Feel It Too" (Furay) – 5:32
"Ol’ Forgiver" (Cotton) – 3:38
"What If I Should Say I Love You" (Furay) – 3:37
"Just for Me and You" (Furay) – 3:37

2013 Iconoclassic edition bonus tracks
11. "C'mon" (studio version) (Furay) – 2:52
12. "A Man Like Me" (studio version) (Furay) – 3:36

Personnel
Poco
Richie Furay – rhythm electric and acoustic guitars, vocals
Paul Cotton – lead electric and acoustic guitars, vocals
Rusty Young – pedal steel guitar, banjo, mandolin, dobro, vocals
Timothy B. Schmit – bass guitar, vocals
George Grantham – drums, vocals
with:
Jay Spell - piano

Production
Steve Cropper - producer
Charlie Bragg, Lacy O’Neal, Roy Segal - recording engineer
Kathy Johnson - front cover assemblage

References

Poco albums
1971 albums
Epic Records albums
Albums produced by Steve Cropper